Crystallographic axis may refer to a:

 rotational symmetry axis in a crystal
 crystallographic screw axis
 direct or reciprocal axis of a crystal's unit cell